Timmonsville High School is part of Florence County School District Four in Timmonsville, South Carolina. The high school is part of a school campus that also contains Brockington Elementary School and Johnson Middle School. The school campus complex was built in 2000 and contains all three schools in an interconnected building and the football field. The high school serves grades 9 through 12. The student/teacher ratio is 8 in comparison to the state average of 14. The high student population is approximately 270 students.

Timmonsville High School offers the following subjects: English, mathematics, science, social studies, Spanish, exceptional education, fine arts, physical education and health, Army ROTC, career and technology education, welding, electricity, cosmetology, health science technology, and business education.

Timmonsville High School is "Home of the Whirlwinds." As of 2016, Langston Brown was the principal of Timmonsville High School. As of 2009, there were 22 teaching staff members at the high school.

Notable alumni 
 Cale Yarborough (Class of 1957), former NASCAR driver and champion (1976, 1977, 1978)

 Mike Anderson (Class of 1969), former Major League Baseball (MLB) player

References 

Public high schools in South Carolina
Schools in Florence County, South Carolina